Vantix Diagnostics  (formerly Universal Sensors) is a biotechnology company based in Cambridge, that develops and markets in vitro diagnostics. Vantix had worked to develop a hand held device for detecting illicit drugs.

References

External links
 

Biotechnology companies of the United Kingdom